Select Parts of the Holy Bible for the use of the Negro Slaves in the British West-India Islands, sometimes referred to as a slave bible, is a censored version of the Bible specifically made for teaching a supposed pro-slavery version of Christianity to enslaved people in the British West Indies.

Background
The book was published by a collective group of missionaries called The Incorporated Society for the Conversion and Religious Instruction and Education of the Negro Slaves in the British West India Islands; Beilby Porteus was the president of this society.

It was produced in England in the early 19th century for use in the British West Indies. It had all "references to freedom and escape from slavery" excised, while passages encouraging obedience and submission were emphasized.  These references emphasizing loyalty and submission to the slave master were instructions handed down by Porteus, who stated: "prepare a short form  of public prayer, together with select  portions of scripture particularly those which relate of the slave duties toward the master."

British missionaries used it in the education and conversion of the enslaved population. The editors included only 10 percent of the Old Testament and half of the New Testament. For example, among the excluded passages are Galatians 3:28 which states: "There is neither Jew nor Greek, there is neither bond nor free, there is neither male nor female: for ye are all one in Christ Jesus". Exodus 21:16 and Deuteronome 23:16-17 were also removed.

The publishers of the slave bible thought these sections, such as the Exodus, the Book of Psalms, and the Book of Revelation, "could instill in slaves a dangerous hope for freedom and dreams of equality." Passages like , "Servants, be obedient to them that are your masters according to the flesh, with fear and trembling, in singleness of your heart, as unto Christ," were retained. The Museum of the Bible, during a 2018 exhibition called "The Slave Bible: Let the Story Be Told", exhibited an example from 1807.  This bible was one of three copies of this version, and is owned by Fisk University. It was printed by Law and Gilbert of London, for the Society for the Conversion of Negro Slaves.

See also
 The Bible and slavery
 Christian views on slavery

References

Bible translations into English
Slavery in the British West Indies
Christianity in the Caribbean
Book censorship in the United Kingdom
Cultural history of Jamaica
Slave
Slave
Christianity and slavery